Valenzuela's 2nd congressional district is one of the two congressional districts of the Philippines in the city of Valenzuela. It has been represented in the House of Representatives of the Philippines since 2001. The district was created following Valenzuela's conversion into a highly-urbanized city through Republic Act No. 8526 on February 14, 1998. It consists of nine barangays in the southern part of the city, namely Bagbaguin, General T. de Leon, Karuhatan, Mapulang Lupa, Marulas, Maysan, Parada, Paso de Blas and Ugong. It is currently represented in the 19th Congress by Eric M. Martinez of the PDP–Laban.

Representation history

Election results

2022
Incumbent representative is Eric Martinez.

2019
Incumbent representative is Eric Martinez.

2016
Incumbent Magi Gunigundo.

2013
Incumbent Magi Gunigundo.

2010
Incumbent Magi Gunigundo.

2007
Incumbent Magi Gunigundo.

See also
Legislative districts of Valenzuela

References

Congressional districts of the Philippines
Politics of Valenzuela, Metro Manila
1998 establishments in the Philippines
Congressional districts of Metro Manila
Constituencies established in 1998